Maryland's Legislative District 20 is one of 47 districts in the state for the Maryland General Assembly. It covers part of Montgomery County.

Demographic characteristics
As of the 2020 United States census, the district had a population of 130,131, of whom 100,770 (77.4%) were of voting age. The racial makeup of the district was 42,998 (33.0%) White, 42,758 (32.9%) African American, 1,302 (1.0%) Native American, 10,114 (7.8%) Asian, 41 (0.0%) Pacific Islander, 18,901 (14.5%) from some other race, and 14,008 (10.8%) from two or more races. Hispanic or Latino of any race were 31,560 (24.3%) of the population.

The district had 75,448 registered voters as of October 17, 2020, of whom 13,164 (17.4%) were registered as unaffiliated, 5,834 (7.7%) were registered as Republicans, 55,431 (73.5%) were registered as Democrats, and 597 (0.8%) were registered to other parties.

Political representation
The district is represented for the 2023–2027 legislative term in the State Senate by William C. Smith Jr. (D) and in the House of Delegates by Lorig Charkoudian (D), David Moon (D) and Jheanelle K. Wilkins (D).

References

Montgomery County, Maryland
20
20